Paulo José Araújo Corrêa (born 24 July 1957) is a Brazilian politician, affiliated with the Brazilian Social Democratic Party, president of the Legislative Assembly of Mato Grosso do Sul since February 2019, serving his sixth term as State Deputy for the state.

In April 2018, Paulo Corrêa joined the Brazilian Social Democracy Party. In the 2018 elections Paulo Corrêa was re-elected with 27,664 votes to continue representing the population of Mato Grosso do Sul in the state parliament. On February 1, 2019, he was elected President of the Legislative Assembly of Mato Grosso do Sul for the 2019-2020 biennium.

As president of the House of Laws, he assumed the commitment to face, together with the other deputies, the challenges generated by the economic crisis and social problems, highlighting the need for the Legislature to always work together with the other powers in order to meet the demands in all areas of society.

References 

Brazilian politicians
Living people
1957 births